is a Japanese football club based in Higashiōsaka, Osaka Prefecture. They play in J3 League, the third tier of professional football league in the Japanese football league system.

History
FC Osaka was founded in 1996. 11 years after its foundation, in 2007, the team won the Osaka Prefectural Football League Division 1 for the first time. In 2010, they participated in the Shakaijin Cup for the first time, losing to Norbritz Hokkaido in the first round). In 2011, they won the 1st Division of the Osaka Prefectural League for the 3rd time in three consecutive years. The club won the Kansai Prefectural Soccer League Final Tournament, and was then promoted to the Kansai Soccer League Division 2. From this year onwards, the club's operating corporation was changed from "Nippon Entertainment Group Co., Ltd." to "R Dash Co., Ltd.".

Six years at Regional League level
In 2012, they won the Kansai Soccer League 2nd Division with 13 wins and 1 loss, including a uncommon run of 10 consecutive wins that started on their debut match at the tournament, and this contributed to their promotion to the Kansai Soccer League 1st Division. In 2013, the club won the Division 1 with 12 wins and 2 draws, remaining unbeaten at the competition. However, on the Regional Champions League, they weren't able to finish in a position that would enable them to get a promotion, exiting the competition at the group stage. On the same year, it was established the women's teamm, "FC Osaka CRAVO".

In 2014, won The KSL Island Shield of Awaji, the won the Shakaijin Cup, and the Osaka Prefectural Soccer Championship for the first time, which win enabled them to qualify, and make their debut at the Emperor's Cup. FC Osaka lost to Zweigen Kanazawa in the first round. But, this Emperor's Cup loss in the middle of the year didn't reflected how the rest of the season would go, as it resulted favorably for the Osaka-based team. After winning the Shakaijin Cup, the club was runners-up at the Regional Champions League, granting them the possibility of promotion for the Japan Football League (Japan's 4th tier league), only pending the JFL Board of Directors approval, which was given on 10 December.

Eight-year stint at JFL
In 2015, they defeated Cerezo Osaka in the first round of the 2015 Emperor's Cup. In 2018, the management corporation "General Incorporated Association FC Osaka Sports Club" was established as a prerequisite for joining the J League. In their 4th year participating in JFL, FC Osaka ended up in their highest ever position, finishing the tournament as runners-up.  On 27 November of the same year, the club received an approval to make Higashiosaka City their hometown. The city is home to the Higashiosaka City Hanazono Rugby Stadium, which has undergone major renovations, ahead of the 2019 Rugby World Cup.

After that, on 26 November 2019, an agreement was signed between FC Osaka and Higashiosaka City regarding the renovation of the second ground of Higashiosaka Hanazono Rugby Stadium. Specifically, the second ground, which was deteriorating due to its age, was equipped with spectator seats for more than 5,000 spectators, preparing themselves to a possible promotion for the J3 League. A roof was installed on one of the stands, and the stand behind the goal was sloped. All construction costs was funded by FC Osaka and donated to the Higashiosaka City after completion. This renovation work was realized successfully, with the refurbishment work being completed after December 2021. In addition, on 26 November 2019, the club submitted documents for the J.League, applicating for the "J.League 100 Year Plan club status", as one of the prerequisites to join the J.League.

On 25 February 2020, the submitted documents received J.League approval, making FC Osaka one of the 100-year plan club status holders. After that, on 30 June, the club applied for a J3 league license, aiming to be promoted for the J3 league by 2021. The J3 League license was issued by the J.League on 15 September. FC Osaka couldn't be promoted to the J3 League on 2020, as at the time of league's abandonment, they were placed at 9th. On 2021, it worked out nearly the same way for the club, finishing just two points behind the Top 4, and at the 7th place.

"FC" not only means "football club", but also various fields (Field), foundation / substrate (Foundation), for people (For people) "F" ” and the “C” which stands for Community contribution, Cooperation, Confidence and Creation. Osaka” was changed to “F.C.Osaka” (English notation: F.C.✩OSAKA).

On 12 January 2022, the name was changed back to FC Osaka.

Promotion to J3
On 5 November, FC Osaka were promoted to J3 League for the first time in their history, after spending eight seasons in Japan Football League. 15 days later at the same month, The club was promoted after finishing as runners-up and going over the 2,000 minimum average home attendance, with a 10 goal difference between the club and Nara Club, who were awarded as champions. Despite FC Osaka having one more match won than Nara, the club also had two more matches lost than Nara. This tight gap between them and the champions, Nara Club, however, contributed positively for the hardly-fought promotion for the J3 League, where they will be playing from the 2023 season.

Stadium 
FC Osaka will use the Hanazono Rugby Stadium in all matches of the 2023 J3 season, confirmed after the full league calendar was released on 20 January 2023.

League & cup record 

Key

Honours 
 Osaka Prefectural League
 Champions (1): 2013

 Kansai Soccer League
 Champions (1): 2014

Current squad 
As of 17 March 2023.

Club Officials 
For the 2023 season.

Managerial history

Partnerships 
On September 2, 2014, FC Osaka announced a partnership with Sporting Clube de Macau, which makes the transfer of players between Macau and Japan possible.

References

External links 
F.C. Osaka website
Official Facebook Page

 
Association football clubs established in 1996
Football clubs in Japan
1996 establishments in Japan
Japan Football League clubs
J.League clubs
Football clubs in Osaka Prefecture